Cephetola is a genus of butterflies in the family Lycaenidae. All species are endemic to the Afrotropical realm.

Species
Cephetola aureliae  Libert, 1999
Cephetola australis  Libert, 1999
Cephetola barnsi  Libert, 1999
Cephetola bwamba (Jackson, 1964)
Cephetola catuna (Kirby, 1890)
Cephetola cephena (Hewitson, 1873)
Cephetola chari  Libert & Collins, 1999
Cephetola collinsi  Libert & Larsen, 1999
Cephetola dolorosa (Roche, 1954)
Cephetola ducarmei  Libert, 1999
Cephetola eliasis (Kielland & Congdon, 1998)
Cephetola epitolina  Libert & Collins, 1999
Cephetola gerdae (Kielland & Libert, 1998)
Cephetola ghesquierei (Roche, 1954)
Cephetola godarti  Libert & Collins, 1999
Cephetola izidori (Kielland & Congdon, 1998)
Cephetola kakamegae  Libert & Collins, 1999
Cephetola kamengensis (Jackson, 1962)
Cephetola karinae  Bouyer & Libert, 1999
Cephetola katerae (Jackson, 1962)
Cephetola kiellandi (Libert & Congdon, 1998)
Cephetola maculata (Hawker-Smith, 1926)
Cephetola maesseni  Libert, 1999
Cephetola marci  Collins & Libert, 1999
Cephetola mariae  Libert, 1999
Cephetola martini (Libert, 1998)
Cephetola mengoensis (Bethune-Baker, 1906)
Cephetola mercedes (Suffert, 1904)
Cephetola mpangensis (Jackson, 1962)
Cephetola nigeriae (Jackson, 1962)
Cephetola nigra (Bethune-Baker, 1903)
Cephetola obscura (Hawker-Smith, 1933)
Cephetola orientalis (Roche, 1954)
Cephetola oubanguensis Libert & Collins, 1999
Cephetola ouesso (Jackson, 1962)
Cephetola overlaeti  Libert, 1999
Cephetola peteri (Kielland & Congdon, 1998)
Cephetola pinodes (Druce, 1890)
Cephetola quentini  Bouyer & Libert, 1999
Cephetola rileyi (Audeoud, 1936)
Cephetola subcoerulea (Roche, 1954)
Cephetola subgriseata (Jackson, 1964)
Cephetola sublustris (Bethune-Baker, 1904)
Cephetola tanzaniensis  Libert, 1999
Cephetola vinalli (Talbot, 1935)
Cephetola viridana (Joicey & Talbot, 1921)

References

Poritiinae
Butterfly genera